Giannopoulos, Yannopoulos, Yiannopoulos, Gianopoulos or Gianopulos, variously transliterated from the , is a Greek family name, which means "son of John". The female version of the name is Giannopoulou/Yiannopoulou (Γιαννοπούλου). Notable people with this name include:

People

Giannopoulos

Charis Giannopoulos (born 1989), Greek basketball player
Kyriakos Giannopoulos (born 1959), Greek water polo player
Nick Giannopoulos (born 1963), Greek Australian stand-up comedian and actor
Panagiotis Giannopoulos (born 1972), Greek footballer
 (1870–1869), Greek poet
Stavros Giannopoulos (born 1961), Greek water polo player
Tasos Giannopoulos (1931–1977), Greek movie actor
Tout Giannopoulos (born 1964), name used by Estonian basketball player Tiit Sokk, while playing in Greece

Gianopoulos
Panio Gianopoulos (born 1975), Greek American writer and editor

Gianopulos
Jim Gianopulos (born 1951), Greek American businessman, CEO of Fox Entertainment Group
Mimi Gianopulos (born 1989), Greek American film actress, daughter of Jim Gianopulos

Giannopoulou
Eleni Konsolaki-Giannopoulou, Greek archeologist
Ifigeneia Giannopoulou (1964–2004), Greek songwriter and author

Yannopoulos
Dino Yannopoulos (1919–2003), Greek stage director 
Evangelos Yannopoulos (1918–2003), Greek lawyer and socialist politician

Yiannopoulos
A. N. Yiannopoulos (1928–2017), Greek-born American law professor
 (born 1957), Greek-born German screenwriter and novelist
Milo Yiannopoulos (born Milo Hanrahan 1984), British journalist and commentator

Greek-language surnames
Surnames
Patronymic surnames